The Sony Xperia 1 II is an Android smartphone manufactured by Sony Mobile. Part of Sony's Xperia series, the phone was announced along with the mid-range Xperia 10 II on February 24, 2020. Key upgrades over its predecessor, the Xperia 1, include support for 5G connectivity and Qi wireless charging, and a triple-lens camera which incorporates ZEISS-branded lenses with T✻ (T-Star) anti-reflective coating as well as technology brought over from Sony's Alpha camera lineup.

The Xperia 1 II ships with support for 5G NR in Europe and Asia (making it Sony's first Xperia device to support this network), while the United States ships with a 4G variant. Although 5G networks are supported, it only supports "sub-6" 5G, meaning it is not compatible with millimeter-wave (mmWave) networks.

Design
The Xperia 1 II retains Sony's signature square design that is seen on previous Xperia phones. The phone has Corning Gorilla Glass 6 protection on the front and back as well as IP65 and IP68 certifications for water resistance. The build has a pair of symmetrical bezels on the top and the bottom, where the front-facing dual stereo speakers and the front camera are placed. The left side of the phone contains a compartment for a SIM card and a microSD card, while the right side contains a fingerprint reader embedded into the power button, a volume rocker and a shutter button. The rear cameras are arranged in a vertical strip. The phone shipped in five colors with the first three: Black, Purple and White available globally. There are also two colors exclusive to East Asian markets, Frosted Black for Japan and Mainland China and Mirror Lake Green for Mainland China and Taiwan.

Specifications

Hardware
The Xperia 1 II has a Qualcomm Snapdragon 865 SoC and an Adreno 650 GPU, accompanied by 8 GB or 12 GB of RAM, 256 GB storage space (which can be expanded up to 1 TB via the microSD card slot), and one nano SIM card slot. The display is identical to the one on the Xperia 1, a 6.5-inch 4K HDR OLED with a 21:9 aspect ratio, which Sony claims offers "unprecedented color accuracy". It is also capable of displaying one billion colors; most smartphone displays have sixteen million colors. The phone has a 4000 mAh battery, and supports wireless charging. The phone has front-facing dual stereo speakers and a 3.5 mm audio jack. The latter feature was not present on Sony's previous flagship phone, and technology journalists noted it as unusual in a flagship smartphones in 2020.

Camera 
The phone has a triple 12 MP camera setup and a 3D iToF sensor on the back, and an 8 MP camera on the front. The rear cameras comprise the main lens (24 mm f/1.7), the ultra wide angle lens (16 mm f/2.2), and the telephoto lens (70 mm f/2.4); each uses ZEISS' T✻ (T-Star) anti-reflective coating. The phone has support for 4K video recording for up to 60 FPS and for 2K for up to 120 FPS. Android 11 update enables 4K video recording up to 120 FPS

Software
The Xperia 1 II released with Android 10, now updated to Android 12. Sony has also paired the phone's camera tech with a "Photo Pro" mode developed by Sony's camera division α (Alpha) and a "Cinema Pro" mode developed by Sony's cinematography division CineAlta, whose features take after Sony's Alpha and CineAlta cameras.

Notes

References

External links 

 

Android (operating system) devices
Flagship smartphones
Sony smartphones
Mobile phones introduced in 2020
Mobile phones with multiple rear cameras
Mobile phones with 4K video recording